Ahmed Al-Gizani (born August 10, 1991) is a Saudi football player who played as a forward in the Pro League.

References

1991 births
Living people
Saudi Arabian footballers
Al Nassr FC players
Al-Qadsiah FC players
Al-Hazem F.C. players
Hajer FC players
A.D. Sanjoanense players
Al-Orobah FC players
Al-Anwar Club players
Saudi Arabian expatriate footballers
Expatriate footballers in Portugal
Saudi Arabian expatriate sportspeople in Portugal
Place of birth missing (living people)
Saudi Professional League players
Saudi First Division League players
Saudi Fourth Division players
Association football forwards